Gašnica is a village in the municipality of Gradiška, Republika Srpska, Bosnia and Herzegovina. It is most well-known as being the birthplace of Lepa Radić.

References

Populated places in Gradiška, Bosnia and Herzegovina